Frigyes Bán (19 June 1902 – 30 September 1969) was a Hungarian film director. His wife was the actress Éva Vass (1933-2019).

Selected filmography
 One Night in Transylvania (1941)
 Háry János (1941)
 Treasured Earth (1948)
 St. Peter's Umbrella (1958)
 I'll Go to the Minister (1962)

Bibliography
 Buranbaeva, Oksana & Mladineo, Vanja. Culture and Customs of Hungary. ABC-CLIO, 2011.

External links

1902 births
1969 deaths
Male screenwriters
Hungarian male writers
Hungarian film directors
20th-century Hungarian screenwriters
Film directors from Košice